Balanchine is a crater on the planet Mercury. It possesses a ray system of slightly bluish rays.  These rays inspired the name of the crater due to their similarity to the tutu in George Balanchine's Serenade.

Extensive Hollows are present within Balanchine.

Balanchine lies in the northeast portion of the Caloris Basin.  To the northeast of Balanchine is Nervo crater, and to the southeast is March.

References

External links
 Image of the crater

Impact craters on Mercury
Raditladi quadrangle